Victor-Napoléon Vuillerme-Dunand (1810 in Turin – 4 May 1876) was a 19th-century French puppeteer whose family originated from Jura. He is the author of one of three original sources of the classical repertoire of the Lyon theater dating from 1852.

External links 
 Victor-Napoléon Vuillerme-Dunand on Data.bnf.fr
 Théâtre lyonnais de Guignol on Gallica

French puppeteers
1810 births
Entertainers from Turin
1876 deaths